SD40 may refer to:
 Canon PowerShot SD40, a digital camera
 EMD SD40, a diesel-electric locomotive
 South Dakota Highway 40
 SD-40 alcohol, ethanol denatured by adding denatonium benzoate